William Egginton (born 1969) is a literary critic and philosopher. He has written extensively on a broad range of subjects, including theatricality, fictionality, literary criticism, psychoanalysis and ethics, religious moderation, and theories of mediation.

Life and career
William Egginton was born in Syracuse, New York in 1969. He received his PhD in Comparative Literature from Stanford University in 1999. His doctoral thesis, "Theatricality and Presence: a Phenomenology of Space and Spectacle in Early Modern France and Spain," was written under the direction of Hans Ulrich Gumbrecht. He currently resides with his wife, Bernadette Wegenstein, and their three children, in Baltimore. William Egginton is the Decker Professor in the Humanities and Director of the Alexander Grass Humanities Institute at the Johns Hopkins University, where he teaches  Spanish and Latin American literature, literary theory, and the relation between literature and philosophy.

Works
William Egginton is the author of How the World Became a Stage (2003), Perversity and Ethics (2006), A Wrinkle in History (2007), The Philosopher's Desire (2007), The Theater of Truth (2010), In Defense of Religious Moderation (2011), and The Man Who Invented Fiction: How Cervantes Ushered In the Modern World (2016). He is the co-author of Medialogies: reading reality in the age of inflationary media (2017). He is also co-editor with Mike Sandbothe of The Pragmatic Turn in Philosophy (2004), translator of Lisa Block de Behar's Borges, the Passion of an Endless Quotation (2003, 2nd edition 2014), and co-editor with David E. Johnson of Thinking With Borges (2009). In 2017, he co-authored the book Medialogies: Reading Reality in the Age of Inflationary Media with David R. Castillo. In 2018, Bloomsbury published his book, The Splintering of the American Mind: Identity, Inequality, and the Future of Community.

Selected bibliography

Books
 Egginton, William. The Splintering of the American Mind: Identity, Inequality, and the Future of Community. New York: Bloomsbury USA. {{ISBN|978-1635571332}}
 Castillo, David R., and William Egginton (2017). Medialogies: reading reality in the age of inflationary media. New York: Bloomsbury Academic. {{ISBN|978-1628923605}}
 
 Pre-review - Christensen, Bryce: December 1, 2015. Booklist. http://www.booklistonline.com/The-Man-Who-Invented-Fiction-How-Cervantes-Ushered-in-the-Modern-World-William-Egginton/pid=7676627
 
 Review - Daley, Kathleen: June 12, 2011. The Newark Star-Ledger. http://www.nj.com/entertainment/arts/index.ssf/2011/06/in_defense_of_religious_modera.html
 Review by Kirkus Reviews - https://www.kirkusreviews.com/book-reviews/william-egginton/defense-religious-moderation/
 
 Reviewed in: CLIO 39.3 (2010): 402-407; Modern Language Quarterly 73.1 (2012): 98-101; Comparative Literature Studies 49.2 (2012): 311-314; Revista Hispánica Moderna, 64.2 (2011): 222-224; Teatro: Revista de estudios culturales, 24 (2012) PDF available at:http://digitalcommons.conncoll.edu/teatro/vol24/iss24/ 
 
 Reviewed in Choice 45.6:1-2 (2008); Book News (November 2007) http://www.booknews.com/ref_issues/ref_nov2007/stanford2.html
 
 Reviewed in Revista Canadiense de Estudios Hispánicos, 29.3 (Spring 2007) 523-525.
 
 Reviewed in symploklè 14:1-2 (2006):363-4.
 
 Reviewed in Modern Language Notes 118.5 (2003): 1327-1329; Theatre Research International 30.1 (2005): 102-3; Revista canadiense de estudios hispanos 29.3 (2005): 609-11; Bulletin of the Comediantes 57.1 (2005): 217-218.

Edited and translated books
 Second edition and translation of Lisa Block de Behar, Borges: The Passion of an Endless Quotation, SUNY Press, 2014
 Co-editor, with David E. Johnson, Thinking With Borges, Aurora, CO: The Davies Group Publishers, 2009
 Borges: The Passion of an Endless Quotation, by Lisa Block de Behar, translated and with an introduction by William Egginton, Albany: SUNY Press, 2003
  Co-editor, with Mike Sandbothe, The Pragmatic Turn in Philosophy: Contemporary Engagements Between Analytic and Continental Thought, Albany: SUNY Press, 2004
 Co-editor, with Jeffrey T. Schnapp and Peter Gilgen, Disciplining Literature. Stanford Humanities Review 6.1 (1998)

Chapters in books
 Can Neuroscience Overturn Roe v. Wade?" in The Stone Reader: Modern Philosophy in 133 Arguments, eds. Peter Catapano and Simon Critchley, New York: Norton, 2016.
 "The Limits of the Coded World," in The Stone Reader: Modern Philosophy in 133 Arguments, eds. Peter Catapano and Simon Critchley, New York: Norton, 2016.
 "Bodies in Motion: An Exchange," with Alex Rosenberg, in The Stone Reader: Modern Philosophy in 133 Arguments, eds. Peter Catapano and Simon Critchley, New York: Norton, 2016.
 "Afterword: What Are Talking About When We Talk About Zombies," in Castillo, Schmid, Reilly, and Browning, Zombie Talk: Culture, History, Politics, New York: Palgrave, 2016, 106-114.
 "Borges on Eternity," in Eternity, a History, ed. Yitzhak Y. Melamed, Oxford: Oxford University Press, 2016, 277-282.
 "Crime Shows—CSI: Hapsburg Madrid," in Peter Goodrich and Valerie Hayaert (eds), Genealogies of Legal Vision, London: Routledge, 2015, 243-58
 "The Eradication of Transcendence," in Braidotti et al. eds, The Postsecular Turn, 2014
 "Potentiality of Life," in Silvia Mazzini ed., Reading Hermeneutic Communism, Continuum, 2014
 "Staging the Event: The Theatrical Ground of Metaphysical Framing," in Michael Marder and Santiago Zabala, eds. Being Shaken, Palgrave, 2014, 177-85
 "¿Tolerancia o fundamentalismo: una pregunta contemporánea," interview collected in Diálogos en la Finis Terrae: Entrevistas de Marco Antonio de la Parra, ed. Constanza López (Santiago de Chile: Ediciones Finis Terrae, 2013): 39-50
 "Neither Here nor There: The Everyday Dialectics of Manuel Cruz," in Vivir para pensar, eds. Fina Birulés, Antonio Gómez Ramos and Concha Roldán, Madrid: Paidós, 2011
 "Three Versions of Divisibility: Borges, Kant, and the Quantum," Thinking With Borges, eds. Egginton and Johnson, Aurora, CO, The Davies Group, 2009, 53-72
 Co-author, with Bernadette Wegenstein, UNESCO Online Encyclopedia of Social Sciences and Humanities—"Media Impact on Literature" entry, (2008)
 "Intimacy and Anonymity, or How the Audience Became a Crowd," Crowds, eds. Jeffrey T. Schnapp and Matthew Tiews, Stanford: Stanford University Press, 2007, 97-110
 "Keeping Pragmatism Pure: Rorty with Lacan," in Egginton and Sandbothe, eds., The Pragmatic Turn in Philosophy: Contemporary Engagements Between Analytic and Continental Thought (Albany, NY: SUNY Press, 2004)
 "Sobre el espaciamiento: el espacio paranoico del Dr. Francia," in Espacios y discurosos compartidos en la literatura de América Latina. Actas del Coloquio Internacional del Comité de Estudios Latinoamericanos de la Asociación Internacional de Literatura Comparada, ed. Biagio D'Angelo (Lima: Fondo Editorial de la Universidad Católica Sedes Sapientiae-Fondo, Editorial de la Universidad Nacional Mayor de San Marcos, 2003) 102-110
 "Facing the Defacement of Death: Heidegger, Deleuze, and García Lorca," Convergencias Hispanicas: Selected Proceedings And Other Essays On Spanish And Latin American Literature, Film, And Linguistics, eds. Elizabeth Scarlett and Howard B.Wescott (Juan de la Cuesta Hispanic Monographs, 2002) 103-118
 "Mímesis e teatralidade," in Mascaras da mimesis: a obra de Luiz Costa Lima (Rio de Janeiro: Record Editora, 1999) 321-342

Articles and other publications
 "Stranger Than Fiction," The European Magazine, January 15, 2015
 "Vampire Dreamboats and Zombie Capitalists," New York Times Opinionator, The Stone, October 26, 2014
 "On Borges, Particles, and the Paradox of the Perceived World," New York Times Opinionator, The Stone, April 28, 2013
 "Affective Disorder," diacritics 40.2 (2012 [appeared 2013]): 24-43
  "Determinismo versus libertad humana," in Revista Cronopio, Medellín, Colombia, Nov. 4, 2012
 "Can Neuroscience Challenge Roe V. Wade?" New York Times Opinionator, The Stone, Oct 28, 2012
 "The Reality of Caudal," (Re)Reading Gracián in a Self-Made World.Hispanic Issues On Line Debates 4 (Fall 2012): 42–44. Web.
 "Religion – Conspiracy – Code," MLN, special issue: "The Long Shadow of Political Theology," 126.4 (2011): 32-43
 "Afterword: The Trap of Relevance," Hispanic Literatures and the Question of a Liberal Education. Ed. Luis Martín-Estudillo and Nicholas Spadaccini. Hispanic Issues On Line 8 (Fall 2011): 222–229.
"The Revenge of the Novel: Mario Vargas Llosa, the new Nobel laureate, has always seen fiction as much more than just stories." Foreign Policy, October 7 (2010). http://www.foreignpolicy.com/articles/2010/10/07/the_revenge_of_the_novel
"On Radical Atheism, Chronolibidinal Reading, and Impossible Desires," CR: The New Centennial Review 9.1 (2009): 191–209
"The Baroque as a Problem of Thought," PMLA 124.1 (2009): 143-49
Co-author, with David Castillo, "Hispanism(s), Briefly: A Reflection on the State of the Discipline," online supplement to Hispanic Issues (2006)

References

External links
 Arcade: Literature, the Humanities, & the World
 William Egginton on Twitter
 JHU Department of German and Romance Languages and Literatures
 Library of Congress Author Record
 William Egginton on Academia.edu

1969 births
Living people
American literary critics
American philosophers